Elaphrus californicus is a species of ground beetle in the subfamily Elaphrinae. It was described by Mannerheim in 1843.

References

Elaphrinae
Beetles described in 1843